The slaty-legged crake or banded crake (Rallina eurizonoides) is a waterbird in the rail and crake family, Rallidae.

Distribution and habitat
Its breeding habitat is swamps and similar wet areas in well-wooded country across south Asia east from India, Pakistan, and Sri Lanka to the Philippines  and Indonesia.  The rails are mainly permanent residents throughout their range, but some northern populations migrate further south in winter.

Description
The slaty-legged crake is about 25 cm long. Its body is flattened laterally to allow easier passage through the undergrowth. It has long toes and a short tail. Colouring includes a brown back, chestnut head and breast, and strong black-and-white barring on the flanks, belly and undertail. The throat is white, the bill is yellowish, and the legs are green.  Sexes are similar; juveniles are dark brown above and below, although they have the belly barring and white throat.

Behaviour
Slaty-legged crakes are territorial, but are quite secretive, hiding in bushes when disturbed.  They probe with their bill in mud or shallow water, also picking up food by sight. They forage for berries and insects on the ground, or clambering through bushes and undergrowth. They nest in a dry location on the ground or low bush, laying 4–8 eggs. A study conducted in Nilambur, Kerala in southern India shows that the incubation period was about 20 days.

References

 Birds of India by Grimmett, Inskipp and Inskipp, 

slaty-legged crake
Birds of India
Birds of Nepal
Birds of Eastern Himalaya
Birds of Hainan
Birds of Taiwan
Birds of the Ryukyu Islands
Birds of Southeast Asia
slaty-legged crake